Philip Alan Crosby (born 9 November 1962) is an English former professional footballer who played as a left back.

Career
Born in Leeds, Crosby played for Grimsby Town, Rotherham United, Peterborough United and York City.

Crosby also participated at the 1981 FIFA World Youth Championship, making four appearances in the tournament.

References

1962 births
Living people
English footballers
Grimsby Town F.C. players
Rotherham United F.C. players
Peterborough United F.C. players
York City F.C. players
English Football League players
Association football fullbacks
England youth international footballers